Goran Reljić (born 20 March 1984) is a Croatian mixed martial artist and bare knuckle boxer. A professional MMA competitor who began his career in 2004 and most recently competed in 2020, he has fought for the UFC, RIZIN, and KSW. He is ranked #7 in the ACA Light Heavyweight rankings.

Mixed martial arts career
Reljić made his professional MMA debut on April 4, 2004 against Bojan Spalević. Reljić won the fight via submission (armbar) in the first round. His second fight was against Andrej Bregar in Trbovlje, Slovenia. Reljić won the fight via submission (arm-triangle choke).

Ultimate Fighting Championship
Reljić made his UFC debut at light heavyweight against Wilson Gouveia at UFC 84, where he won in the second round by TKO. He then dropped down to middleweight.

His next fight was slated to be at UFC 90 against Thales Leites, but Reljić sustained a serious back injury and was replaced by Drew McFedries. He would not return to active competition for nearly two years.

Reljić finally made his return and faced CB Dollaway on February 21, 2010 at UFC 110, where he would be making his middleweight debut. Reljić lost the fight via unanimous decision.

Reljić faced Kendall Grove on July 3, 2010 at UFC 116 and lost via split decision. One judge scored the fight 29–28 for Reljić, while the other two judges scored it 30–27 and 29–28 for Grove.

Reljić returned to the light heavyweight division and faced Krzysztof Soszynski on November 13, 2010 at UFC 122. After losing the fight via unanimous decision, Reljić was released from the promotion.

Post-UFC
In his first post UFC fight, Reljić faced Goran Šćepanović on October 7, 2011 at BEFN 6, where he won by TKO in the first round.

Reljić then faced Rogent Lloret in a heavyweight bout on March 24, 2012 at Strength and Honor Championship in Geneve Switzerland. Reljić won the fight by TKO in the first round.

Reljić fought Jan Błachowicz in a main fight on KSW 22 for light heavyweight world title. He lost the fight via unanimous decision.

Reljić then faced Nikolay Osokin at Draka 13 on August 30, 2013. Reljić won the fight via TKO (body kick) in the first round.

Reljić returned to KSW on March 22, 2014 against Karol Celinski at KSW 26. Reljić won the fight via unanimous decision.

In his debut for the Rizin Fighting Federation, Reljić faced Vadim Nemkov on December 29, 2015.  He lost the fight via TKO in the first round.

Absolute Championship Berkut 
He lost the bout via first round TKO.

Reljić faced Carlos Eduardo on April 23, 2021 at ACA 122. He won the bout via split decision.

Reljić faced Davrbek Isakov at ACA 133 on December 4, 2021. He won the bout via TKO in second round.

Reljić faced Vojtech Garba at RFA 3 on July 23, 2022. He lost the bout via unanimous decision.

Bare knuckle boxing career
He made his debut in a bare knuckle boxing becoming UBBADA world light heavyweight champion at BKB 7 event in Liverpool on September 9, 2017, defeating Ricky Nelder via unanimous decision.

On next event he defended title against Jimmy McCrory on November 4, 2017. Fight was declared no contest because McCrory's jaw appears to be broken after a clash of heads.

Bare knuckle boxing record

Championships and accomplishments 
Konfrontacja Sztuk Walki
KSW Light Heavyweight World Championship (One time)
Fight of the Night (One time) vs. Jan Błachowicz 
Ultimate Fighting Championship
Fight of the Night (One time) vs. Wilson Gouveia

Mixed martial arts record

|-
| Loss
| align=center|21–10
| Vojtech Garba
| Decision (unanimous)
| RFA 3
| 
| align=center|3
| align=center|5:00
| Ostrava, Czech Republic
| 
|-
| Win
| align=center|21–9
| Davrbek Isakov
|TKO (punches)
|ACA 133: Bimarzaev vs. Lima
|
|align=center|2
|align=center|1:25
|Saint Petersburg, Russia
| 
|-
| Win
| align=center|20–9
| Carlos Eduardo
| Decision (split)
|ACA 122: Johnson vs. Poberezhets
|
|align=center|3
|align=center|5:00
|Minsk, Belarus
| 
|-
| Loss
| align=center|19–9
| Nikola Dipchikov
| TKO (punches)
| ACA 109: Strus vs. Haratyk
| 
| align=center|1
| align=center|2:38
| Łódź, Poland
| 
|-
| Win
| align=center| 19–8
| Miro Jurković
| Decision (split)
| Serbian Battle Championship 28
| 
| align=center| 3
| align=center| 5:00
| Odžaci, Serbia
|
|-
| Win
| align=center| 18–8
| Pedro Brum
| KO (punch)
| Serbian Battle Championship 27
| 
| align=center| 2
| align=center| 0:24
| Vrbas, Serbia
| 
|-
| Win
| align=center| 17–8
| Anđelko Kitić
| Submission (rear-naked choke)
| Trieste Fight Night 2
| 
| align=center| 1
| align=center| 3:50
| Trieste, Italy
| 
|-
|-
| Win
| align=center| 16–8
| Daniel Dörrer
| Submission (armbar)
| Mannheimer Hafenkeilerei 6
| 
| align=center| 1
| align=center| 3:50
| Mannheim, Germany
| 
|-
| Loss
| align=center| 15–8
| Mattia Schiavolin
| Decision (unanimous)
| Superior FC 15
| 
| align=center| 5
| align=center| 5:00
| Rüsselsheim, Germany
| 
|-
|-
| Loss
| align=center| 15–7
| Kazbek Saidaliev
| Decision (unanimous)
| Akhmat Fight Show 23: Grand Prix Akhmat 2016
| 
| align=center| 3
| align=center| 5:00
| Grozny, Russia
| 
|-
|-
| Loss
| align=center| 15–6
| Vadim Nemkov
| TKO (punches)
| Rizin WGP 2015: Part 1 - Saraba
| 
| align=center| 1
| align=center| 2:58
| Saitama, Japan
| 
|-
| Loss
| align=center| 15–5
| Tomasz Narkun
| KO (punches)
| KSW 32: Road to Wembley
| 
| align=center| 1
| align=center| 1:55
| London, England
| 
|-
| Win
|align=center|15–4
|Attila Végh
| Decision (split)
| KSW 31: Materla vs. Drwal
|
|align=center| 3
|align=center| 5:00
|Gdańsk, Poland
|
|-
| Win
|align=center|14–4
|Tomasz Narkun
| Decision (majority)
|KSW 29: Reload
|
|align=center| 3
|align=center| 5:00
|Cracow, Poland
|
|-
|Win
|align=center|13–4
|Karol Celinski
|Decision (unanimous)
|KSW 26: Materla vs. Silva 3
|
|align=center|3
|align=center|5:00
|Warsaw, Poland
|
|-
|Win
|align=center|12–4
|Nikolay Osokin
|TKO (body kick)
|Draka 13
|
|align=center|1
|align=center|0:47
|Vladivostok, Russia
|
|-
|Loss
|align=center|11–4
|Jan Błachowicz
|Decision (unanimous)
|KSW 22: Pride Time
|
|align=center|3
|align=center|5:00
|Warsaw, Poland
|
|-
|Win
|align=center|11–3
|Gadji Magomedov
|Decision (unanimous)
|Draka 8
|
|align=center|4
|align=center|3:00
|Nakhodka, Russia
|
|-
|Win
|align=center|10–3
|Rogent Lloret
|TKO (punches)
|S&HC 5
|
|align=center|1
|align=center|3:02
|Geneva, Switzerland
|
|-
|Win
|align=center|9–3
|Goran Šćepanović
|TKO (punches)
|Bilic-Eric Security Fight Night 6
|
|align=center|1
|align=center|1:31
|Zagreb, Croatia
|
|-
|Loss
|align=center|8–3
|Krzysztof Soszynski
|Decision (unanimous)
|UFC 122
|
|align=center|3
|align=center|5:00
|Oberhausen, Germany
|
|-
|Loss
|align=center|8–2
|Kendall Grove
|Decision (split)
|UFC 116
|
|align=center|3
|align=center|5:00
|Nevada, United States
|
|-
|Loss
|align=center|8–1
|C.B. Dollaway
|Decision (unanimous)
|UFC 110
|
|align=center|3
|align=center|5:00
|Sydney, Australia
|
|-
|Win
|align=center|8–0
|Wilson Gouveia
|TKO (punches)
|UFC 84
|
|align=center|2
|align=center|3:15
|Nevada, United States
|
|-
|Win
|align=center|7–0
|Waldemar Golinski
|Decision (unanimous)
|BE 2 - Boxing Explosion 2
|
|align=center|2
|align=center|5:00
|Celje, Slovenia
|
|-
|Win
|align=center|6–0
|Tomek Smykowski
|Submission (armbar)
|CF - The Real Deal
|
|align=center|1
|align=center|4:51
|Maribor, Slovenia
|
|-
|Win
|align=center|5–0
|Petr Kelner
|Submission (armbar)
|Ultimate Fight - Challenge 1
|
|align=center|2
|align=center|3:47
|Samobor, Croatia
|
|-
|Win
|align=center|4–0
|Bojan Mihajlović
|Submission (kimura)
|NS 3 - Noc Skorpiona 3
|
|align=center|1
|align=center|2:51
|Šibenik, Croatia
|
|-
|Win
|align=center|3–0
|Nenad Đurić
|TKO (punches)
|NS 1 - Noc Skorpiona 1
|
|align=center|2
|align=center|0:54
|Zadar, Croatia
|
|-
|Win
|align=center|2–0
|Andrej Bregar
|Submission (arm-triangle choke)
|Trboulje 1 - Croatia vs. Slovenia
|
|align=center|1
|align=center|1:52
|Ljubljana, Slovenia
|
|-
|Win
|align=center|1–0
|Bojan Spalević
|Submission (armbar)
|UFD - Ultimate Fight Dubravc
|
|align=center|1
|align=center|4:20
|Zagreb, Croatia
|

References

External links
 
 

Croatian male mixed martial artists
Middleweight mixed martial artists
Light heavyweight mixed martial artists
Heavyweight mixed martial artists
Mixed martial artists utilizing boxing
Mixed martial artists utilizing Brazilian jiu-jitsu
Sportspeople from Zadar
Croatian practitioners of Brazilian jiu-jitsu
People awarded a black belt in Brazilian jiu-jitsu
Living people
1984 births
Ultimate Fighting Championship male fighters